SpineGuard, S.A. develops and markets probes for the enhancement of spine surgery. The probes, termed PediGuard devices, assist spine surgeons in more accurately drilling a pilot hole in preparation for pedicle screw insertion.

History
Founded in 2009, SpineGuard is a spin-off of SpineVision. SpineGuard founders Pierre Jerome and Stephane Bette purchased the assets of the technology from SpineVision with financial assistance from institutional investors. Along with inventors Maurice Bourlion, PhD, Ciaran Bolger, MD, Ph.D., a neurosurgeon from Dublin, Ireland, Alain Vanquaethem, Biomedical Engineer, and other leading surgeons, the founders developed a technology, Dynamic Surgical Guidance (DSG), intended to make spine surgery safer.

In 2013, SpineGuard went public (ALSGD). It is currently traded in the AlterNext exchange in France.

The corporate headquarters of SpineGuard is in Vincennes, near Paris, France. To support the DSG Technology and its adoption in the US market, SpineGuard Inc. maintains a sales and marketing office in San Francisco, California. SpineGuard also has sales coverage with a network of about 45 distributors worldwide.

Technology
The DSG Technology is based on the differential electrical conductivity of various tissue types. It has been determined that blood, neural and vascular tissue have the most conductivity, cancellous bone has medium conductivity, and cortical bone has the least conductivity of all tissues that are encountered during a typical spinal fusion procedure. Audible and visual signals indicate tissue type based on measurements of electrical conductivity.

SpineGuard products prepare the pilot hole for pedicle screw placement during spine surgery. The PediGuard probes address various spine pathologies and surgical approaches. The PediGuard probe is FDA-cleared and CE-marked, but it is not cleared for use in the cervical spine by the FDA in the US.

The PediGuard probe is a stand-alone, handheld device that can detect possible vertebral cortex perforation during pedicle preparation for screw placement. The PediGuard probes can alert the surgeon prior to a breach by accurately analyzing the electrical conductivity of the surrounding tissues in real-time. This, in turn, can prevent a cortical breach, and also help the surgeon redirect the probe and advance down the desired path. Clinical studies have shown that the PediGuard devices can reduce radiation exposure and screw placement time during the spinal procedure.

References

External links
 Spineguard web site

Resubmission

Spine
Health care companies established in 2009
Val-de-Marne
Medical technology companies of France
Companies based in Île-de-France
French companies established in 2009